Reinforced-Concrete Highway Bridges in Minnesota MPS is a Multiple Property Submission of bridges listed on the National Register of Historic Places in Minnesota.  The submission includes 20 individual bridges.  It also includes the Chicago, Milwaukee and St. Paul Railroad Grade Separation, which comprises 30 bridges built over the Milwaukee Road tracks one block north of Lake Street in Minneapolis.  The submission traces the historical context of reinforced concrete bridge building in Minnesota and cites examples of early and historic bridges.

The submission establishes criteria for bridges to be listed on the National Register.  The National Register contains four primary criteria:
 A. Properties significant to the broad patterns of American history.  This Multiple Property Submission selects bridges that are significantly relevant to a region's development and its transportation system.  The bridges in the Chicago, Milwaukee and St. Paul Railroad Grade Separation are listed in this category because while its bridges are not significant engineering achievements, they provided relief to citizens in south Minneapolis who had to deal with train traffic.
 B. Properties associated with a significant person in America's past.  However, bridges significant in conjunction with their architect are to be listed under criterion C.  It is possible, although unlikely, that a particular bridge may be associated with a significant person other than its designer, such as a politician or city official who advocated for its construction.
 C. Properties significant for their design and construction methods.  The Minnesota Historical Society, in preparing this MPS, decided to select bridges with important qualities.  For example, a bridge that is the oldest of its type, the last surviving member of its type, having the longest span of its type, or associated with a prominent major architect, will be selected as part of this MPS.
 D. Properties with information potential likely to yield information pertinent to history or prehistory.  This is not applicable to reinforced-concrete bridges in Minnesota.

The MPS also documents several eras that were important in reinforced-concrete bridge construction:
 Early experimental designs from the 1890s through 1911
 Early standardized designs promoted by the Minnesota Highway Commission from 1912 through 1921
 A period of Minnesota Highway Department, trunk highway, and major urban bridge building from 1921 through 1945

The Franklin Avenue Bridge and the Mendota Bridge are listed in the MPS as examples of monumental concrete arch bridge construction, but these bridges were listed on the National Register before the MPS was submitted.

References

Road bridges on the National Register of Historic Places in Minnesota
National Register of Historic Places Multiple Property Submissions
Concrete bridges in the United States